Santo Tomás District may refer to:

 Peru:
 Santo Tomás District, Luya, in Luya province, Amazonas region
 Santo Tomás District, Cutervo, in Cutervo province, Cajamarca region
 Santo Tomás District, Chumbivilcas, in Chumbivilcas province, Cusco region
 Santo Tomás de Pata District, in Angaraes province, Huancavelica region
 Costa Rica:
 Santo Tomás District, Santo Domingo, in Santo Domingo canton, Heredia province

See also 
 Santo Tomás (disambiguation)